Charles F. Devan (22 April 1901 – 1980) was a Scottish professional footballer, who played as an outside left.

References

1901 births
1980 deaths
People from Girvan
Scottish footballers
Association football outside forwards
Ashfield F.C. players
St Anthony's F.C. players
Clydebank F.C. (1914) players
Greenock Morton F.C. players
South Shields F.C. (1889) players
Grimsby Town F.C. players
Fulham F.C. players
Scottish Junior Football Association players
Scottish Football League players
English Football League players
Footballers from South Ayrshire